Pasteur is a 1935 French biographical drama film directed by Sacha Guitry and Fernand Rivers and starring Guitry, Maurice Schutz and Gaston Dubosc. It portrays the life of the French scientist Louis Pasteur. Guitry had previous written a 1919 play about Pasteur, in which his father Lucien Guitry had starred.

The film's sets were designed by the art director Robert Gys. Location shooting took place at the Sorbonne in Paris and around Pasteur's hometown of Arbois in Eastern France.

Cast
 Sacha Guitry as Louis Pasteur
 Jean Périer as Le médecin
 José Squinquel as Roux, l'élève
 Maurice Schutz as Le grand-père 
 Camille Beuve as Joseph Lister
 Gaston Dubosc as Le président de l'Acadèmie
 Louis Maurel as Jules Guérin
 Louis Gauthier as Un élève
 Armand Lurville as Un témoin 
 Camille Cousin as Un témoin
 André Marnay as Un médecin
 François Rodon as Le petit Joseph Meister
 Henry Bonvallet as Sadi Carnot

References

Bibliography 
 Brown, Tom. Spectacle in Classical Cinemas: Musicality and Historicity in the 1930s. Routledge, 2015.

External links 
 

1935 films
1930s historical drama films
French historical drama films
Films set in the 19th century
Films set in Paris
Films shot in Paris
1930s French-language films
Films directed by Sacha Guitry
Films directed by Fernand Rivers
1930s French films